Robert Eugene LaMotte (February 15, 1898 – November 2, 1970) was a professional baseball infielder who played in Major League Baseball (MLB) for the Washington Senators (1920–1922) and the St. Louis Browns (1925–1926). He played primarily as a shortstop, but also played about one-third of his games as a third baseman.

External links

Major League Baseball shortstops
Washington Senators (1901–1960) players
St. Louis Browns players
Tampa Smokers players
Memphis Chickasaws players
New Haven Profs players
Milwaukee Brewers (minor league) players
Toronto Maple Leafs (International League) players
Baltimore Orioles (IL) players
Chattanooga Lookouts players
Atlanta Crackers players
Raleigh Capitals players
Nashville Vols players
Little Rock Travelers players
Savannah Indians players
Minor league baseball managers
Baseball players from Savannah, Georgia
1898 births
1970 deaths
Tifton Tilters players